Man of Nazareth is a 1979 historical novel by Anthony Burgess based on his screenplay for Franco Zeffirelli's TV miniseries Jesus of Nazareth. It is the second in a trilogy of Burgess books with biblical themes, the others being Moses and The Kingdom of the Wicked.

Plot introduction
Man of Nazareth is a fictionalized historic account recalling the story of  Jesus from his birth to his death.

Burgess uses a Greek merchant recently returned from Jerusalem following the crucifixion as the narrator, a man recounting the stories he heard about Jesus while conducting his business there.

Release details
1979, United States, McGraw-Hill  , Pub date November 1979, Hardback

Sources, references, external links, quotations

Novelistic portrayals of Jesus
1979 British novels
Film spin-offs
Novels by Anthony Burgess
Novels set in ancient Israel
Novels based on films
Novels set in the 1st century
Books about Jesus
Novels based on the Bible
Cultural depictions of Judas Iscariot
Cultural depictions of Pontius Pilate
McGraw-Hill books